Morna is a village in Mulgi Parish in Viljandi County in southern Estonia. It borders the villages Muri, Tuhalaane, Hirmuküla, Oti and Pärsi as well as other villages in the former Halliste Parish.

References

Villages in Viljandi County
Kreis Fellin